William Granville may refer to:

 William Anthony Granville (1864–1943), mathematician
 William Granville, 3rd Earl of Bath
 William Leveson-Gower, 4th Earl Granville (1880–1953), British sailor and governor
 William Granville (civil servant) (1785–1864), Treasurer of Ceylon